Catherine Z. Elgin (born 1948) is a philosopher working in epistemology and the philosophies of art and science.  She holds a Ph.D. from Brandeis University where she studied with Nelson Goodman and is currently a professor of philosophy of education at the Graduate School of Education at Harvard University.

Philosophical work
Elgin's work has considered such questions as "what makes something cognitively valuable?"  As an epistemologist, she considers the pursuit of understanding to be of higher value than the pursuit of knowledge.

In Considered Judgment, Elgin argues for "a reconception that takes reflective equilibrium as the standard of rational acceptability."

Bibliography
 With Reference to Reference, Hackett, 1983
 Reconceptions in Philosophy and Other Arts and Sciences, together with Nelson Goodman, Routledge, 1988
 Revisionen. Philosophie und andere Künste und Wissenschaften, 1993
 The Philosophy of Nelson Goodman, v. 1. Nominalism, Constructivism, and Relativism, v. 2. Nelson Goodman's New Riddle of Induction, v. 3. Nelson Goodman's Philosophy of Art, v. 4. Nelson Goodman's Theory of Symbols and its Applications, 1997
 Between the Absolute and the Arbitrary (Paperback), Cornell University Press, 1997
 Considered Judgment, Princeton University Press, 1996
 Philosophical Inquiry: Classic and Contemporary Readings, 2007
  Begging to differ, The Philosophers' Magazine, December, 2012
 True Enough, MIT Press, 2017
 "Understanding in Science and Elsewhere": Interview with Catherine Z. Elgin about her philosophy and her intellectual biography, published 2019 on 3:AM Magazine  and republished on 3:16

See also
American philosophy
List of American philosophers

References

Living people
Harvard Graduate School of Education faculty
American philosophers
Brandeis University alumni
Epistemologists
1948 births